Rigellians can mean:

 Rigellians, the alien race featured in The Simpsons
 Rigellians (comics), the alien race featured in Marvel Comics
 Rigellians, comprising several fictional alien races featured in Star Trek